Parapionosyllis elegans is a species of polychaete annelids. It is found in the Atlantic and the Mediterranean.

References 

 Parapionosyllis elegans at WoRMS

Syllidae
Animals described in 1903